Undead or Alive: A Zombedy is a 2007 Western comedy horror film directed by Glasgow Phillips, written by Phillips and Scott Pourroy, and starring Navi Rawat, Chris Kattan and James Denton. The film was later acquired by Image Entertainment, a deal that included both theatrical and home video rights.

Plot

Before his capture, Geronimo had cursed white men, causing people to become zombies. Later, at a house in a small town a man named Ben Goodman (Brian Posehn) acts suspiciously and attacks and eats his wife and daughter's brains.

Luke (Chris Kattan), a cowboy living in the town, plans to marry a saloon girl. On arriving at the saloon to propose to her, he encounters Elmer Winslow (James Denton), who has just arrived in town, and discovers that his "princess" is a prostitute. He picks a fight with Elmer until Sheriff Claypool (Matt Besser), who owns the saloon, jails them and steals $500 which Elmer is carrying. In the adjacent cell is Ben, awaiting his hanging the next morning. Elmer and Luke escape and lock Deputy Cletus (Chris Coppola) in the cell, where he is bitten by Ben.

Luke and Elmer find the sheriff and the prostitute having sex. They steal all the sheriff's money and make a getaway. When the sheriff releases Cletus from the cell he is bitten by him. The next morning hang Ben and assemble a posse to pursue the two fugitives.

Luke and Elmer are ambushed in their sleep by Sue (Navi Rawat), Geronimo's niece who was kidnapped and taken to New York to be educated and has now returned to take her revenge on the soldiers who killed her uncle. After a difficult start they become friends, despite Elmer revealing that he is an army deserter. Sheriff Claypool and Cletus, now zombies, attack the other members of the posse, who also become zombies. They are ambushed by Elmer, Luke and Sue, who realise they cannot be killed and flee.

Meanwhile, the townspeople cut Ben down from the gallows, not realising that hanging cannot "kill" him. He attacks the townspeople. The town's minister (Leslie Jordan) manages to escape by locking himself in an upstairs room at the saloon, now besieged by a horde of zombies. The following morning, he climbs out of the window to get water, but is pursued by zombies and bitten by the prostitute.

Elmer, Luke and Sue are captured by soldiers, former colleagues of Elmer's (his $500 is revealed to have been won from them while gambling), who take them to their fort on the edge of the Grand Canyon. There they discover that the posse has arrived first and turned all the garrison into zombies, who attack the party and also turn all the other soldiers into zombies. They discover they can kill the zombies by decapitation.

During the night, while hiding in the fort, Sue reveals that the only way to be cured of the zombie curse is to eat the living flesh of the medicine man who created the curse. They shoot several cookware objects out of a homemade blunderbuss at the sheriff and the zombies to no avail. Elmer tries to punch First Sergeant Kermit in the mouth, but gets bitten by him. After destroying most of the zombies by blowing up the magazine, he becomes a zombie and throws Cletus off the cliff, before biting Luke.

Sue kills Sheriff Claypool, but is then attacked by Elmer and Luke. The next scene shows Elmer and Luke looking normal again, after having eaten Sue's flesh. The "eating the living flesh" cure apparently also works for relatives of the person who created the curse. Sue apparently tasted like gingerbread. The duo ride off into the sunset as Cletus stands up and chases them.

An epilogue shows Ben digging up his family, now zombies themselves, from the cemetery and the three of them (with their dog) skipping into town.

Cast

 Chris Kattan as Luke
 James Denton as Elmer
 Lew Alexander as Geronimo
 Todd Anderson as Kermit
 Richard Barela as Drunk Zombie
 Matt Besser as Sheriff Claypool
 Brett Brock as Townsman 1
 Richard Bucher as Townsman
 Jeff Chase as Zombie
 Chris Coppola as Cletus
 Gino Crognale as General Store Owner
 Jeffrey J. Dashnaw as Townsman
 Scott Flick as Zombie Soldier
 Michelle Greathouse as Schoolmarm
 Patricia Greer as Saloon Girl
 Leslie Jordan as Padre
 Geoffrey C. Martin as Trap door zombie
 Keola Melhorn as Zombie
 Tracy Melhorn as Zombie
 Michael Patrick Metzdorff as Gunfighter Zombie / Union Soldier Zombie
 Cristin Michele as Kate
 Christopher Allen Nelson as The Captain
 T. Jay O'Brien as Farlow
 Brian Posehn as Ben
 Navi Rawat as Sue
 Chloe Russell as Ruby
 Elizabeth Slagsvol as Saloon Girl
 Russell Solberg as Townsman
 Mia Stallard as Anna
 Ben Zeller as Ebeneezer
 James Blackburn as Zombie soldier
 Brent Lambert as Zombie

Production
The film was shot in Santa Fe, New Mexico for Odd Lot Entertainment. Gary Jones created the make-up and masks for the film.

Release
The film premiered on March 15, 2007, as part of the South by Southwest Festival and was released on December 11, 2007, over Image Entertainment on DVD.

Soundtrack
The score was composed by Bulgarian music producer Ivan Koutikov.

Track list
 Hal Ozsan and Poets and Pornstars – Monkey
 Poets and Pornstars – Get your Kicks
 David Baker – Twists and Turns
 Three Bad Jacks – Crazy in the Head
 Slick Pelt – Cowboy Song
 Colin Blades – Best Friend
 Three Bad Jacks – Hellbound Train
 Terence Jay – Undead or Alive
 Slick Pelt – Danger
 Chris Gerolmo – I'm your Danger

References

External links
 
 

2007 films
2007 comedy films
2007 horror films
2000s Western (genre) comedy films
2000s Western (genre) horror films
2000s comedy horror films
American Western (genre) comedy films
American Western (genre) horror films
American comedy horror films
American zombie comedy films
Films about Native Americans
Cultural depictions of Geronimo
Films set in Arizona
Films shot in New Mexico
2000s English-language films
2000s American films